Hancock is a 2008 American superhero comedy film directed by Peter Berg from a screenplay by Vince Gilligan and Vy Vincent Ngo. The film stars Will Smith, Charlize Theron, and Jason Bateman.

The story was originally written by Vy Vincent Ngo in 1996. It languished in development hell for years with various directors attached, including Tony Scott, Michael Mann, Jonathan Mostow, and Gabriele Muccino, before being filmed in 2007 in Los Angeles with a production budget of $150 million.

In the United States, the film was rated PG-13 by the Motion Picture Association of America after changes were made at their request in order to avoid an R rating, which it had received twice before. The film was released on July 2, 2008, in the United States by Columbia Pictures. Hancock received mixed reviews from critics who praised its performances, visual effects and premise, but criticized its execution and failure to deliver on its potential, especially during its second half. It grossed $629 million worldwide, becoming the fourth highest-grossing film of 2008.

Plot
John Hancock is an alcoholic, reckless superhuman imbued with flight, invulnerability, and super-strength. Acting as a haphazard superhero in Los Angeles, he is often ridiculed and hated by the public for his drunken and careless acts, and becomes enraged when called an "asshole". 

Hancock rescues Ray Embrey, a public relations specialist, from an oncoming train, which he needlessly derails to do it. Thankful and seeing a career opportunity, Ray offers to help improve Hancock's public image. Hancock meets Ray's family, his son Aaron, a fan, and his wife Mary, who is suspicious of him.

Ray encourages Hancock to issue a public apology, and then go to prison for a time, until Los Angeles needs him properly. He reluctantly agrees, struggling to fit in at prison. Two fellow inmates soon threaten him as he put them there, so he injures them. Hancock is visited by Ray, who encourages him to be patient but when he hears he might be in for 8 years he starts to break out. Ray persuades him to stay inside and stick to the plan. Hancock is later visited by Mary and Aaron who bring him homemade spaghetti with meatballs.

The Los Angeles' crime rate rises and Hancock is eventually released to help. He foils a bank robbery orchestrated by Red Parker, with Hancock slicing off his hand to prevent him from activating a dead man's switch. He is praised as a hero and becomes popular.

Hancock has dinner with Ray and Mary, and reveals that he is an amnesiac and immortal, having woken up in a hospital 80 years ago with no memory of his identity. The doctors told him that as he was stopping a mugging and was clubbed in the head. Ray tells Hancock that Mary is Aaron's stepmother and that his biological mother had died in childbirth. Carrying a drunk Ray home, Hancock kisses Mary, who kisses him back but then throws him through the wall, revealing that she also has superpowers. 

The next day, Hancock and Mary speak in private. She explains that there were more like them in the past - sometimes called angels or gods by others - but they are the last pair. They have lived for three thousand years and are soulmates. The other angels/gods paired up, lived human lives and then died. 

Hancock flies away to tell Ray about Mary kissing him, only for her to chase him and incite a violent battle across the city. Ray witnesses the fight, later confronting the duo. Mary admits Hancock is actually her husband from the past, but that she chose to quietly leave him once he had lost his memory. 

After stopping a store robbery, Hancock finds that a bullet has hurt him and he needs hospital treatment. Mary explains that the closer they are, the more mortal they become. They will lose their powers unless they stay apart. The last time Hancock and Mary were together was eighty years ago when Hancock was attacked.

Parker, who escaped prison with several other criminals, attacks the hospital to get revenge. Mary is caught in the crossfire and injured. Hancock recovers, killing the criminals, but is further injured when Parker shoots him. He is saved by Ray, who cuts off Parker's other hand with a fire axe before killing him as well. Hancock throws himself out of the hospital, trying to increase his distance from Mary so  she can recover, before flying off.

A month later, Ray and his family receive a call from Hancock (who is now in New York City), revealing that he has imprinted the Moon's surface with Ray's AllHeart marketing logo. In a mid-credits scene, Hancock confronts a criminal holding a woman at gunpoint and demands that he help him escape from the police, while calling him an asshole in the process, much to Hancock's amusement.

Cast
 Will Smith as John Hancock, an alcoholic superhero or occasionally a supervillain. Hancock is invulnerable, immortal, possesses superhuman strength, reflexes and stamina, highly developed regeneration, and can fly at supersonic speeds. He is also an amnesiac; his first memories are of waking up alone in a hospital in 1931. During his release, the duty nurse asked him for his "John Hancock", which he adopted as his current alias. Smith described the character, "Hancock is not your average superhero. Every day he wakes up mad at the world. He doesn't remember what happened to him and there's no one to help him find the answers."
 Charlize Theron as Mary Embrey, Ray's wife and Hancock's ex-wife who also has powers and abilities like him, but they are both becoming weak as they are close to each other. Theron described Mary, "She makes this conscious decision to live in suburbia and be this soccer mom to her stepson and be the perfect wife—she lives in this bubble. But when people do that it usually means they are hiding some characteristic inside themselves that scares them. That is Mary's case. She knows who she is and what she is capable of."
 Jason Bateman as Ray Embrey, a corporate public relations consultant whose life Hancock saves. Bateman said, "My character sees life through rose-colored glasses so he doesn't understand how people can't see the positive side of Hancock. I like being the everyman. I like being the tour guide, the one who tethers whatever absurdity might be in a film and helps make that tangible to the audience."
 Eddie Marsan as Kenneth "Red" Parker, Jr., a bank robber who later becomes Hancock's arch-nemesis. Having previously filmed the low-budget Happy-Go-Lucky, Marsan found the transition to the big-budget Hancock to be a shock. Marsan said, "I went from being in a car with Sally Hawkins in Happy-Go-Lucky to blowing up a bank in downtown LA." 
Actors Johnny Galecki and Thomas Lennon also appear in the film. Mike Epps makes an uncredited cameo in the post-credits scene. Film producers Akiva Goldsman and Michael Mann appear as executives listening to Ray's lecture. Television host Nancy Grace also has a cameo appearance. Daeg Faerch appears as Michel, the young French American neighborhood bully who is thrown by Hancock in the air for repeatedly insulting him. Atticus Shaffer, later known for his role in the sitcom The Middle, also makes a brief appearance at the beginning of the film.

Production

Development

Vy Vincent Ngo wrote the spec script Tonight, He Comes in 1996. The draft, about a troubled 12-year-old, and a fallen superhero, was initially picked up by director Tony Scott as a potential project. Producer Akiva Goldsman came across the script, which he had considered a favorite, and encouraged Richard Saperstein, then president of development and production at Artisan Entertainment, to acquire it in 2002. Michael Mann was initially attached to direct Tonight, He Comes, but he instead opted to direct Miami Vice. Eventually, Artisan placed the project in turnaround, and it was acquired by Goldsman.

Dave Chappelle was at one point considered for the lead role.

Vince Gilligan and John August rewrote Ngo's script, and Jonathan Mostow was attached to direct the film. Under Mostow's supervision, a ten-page treatment was written to be pitched to Will Smith to portray the lead role in the film. Neither Mostow nor Smith was yet committed to make the project an active priority at the time. Several studios pursued the opportunity to finance the film, and Columbia Pictures succeeded in acquiring the prospect in February 2005. A second draft was scripted by Gilligan following the finalization of the deal with Columbia. The film was initially slated for a holiday 2006 release.

In November 2005, Mostow and Smith committed to Tonight, He Comes, with production slated to begin in Los Angeles in summer 2006.  Smith's salary in his pay or play contract for the film was $20 million and 20 percent of the film's gross.  The actor had also set up a pay or play contract to film I Am Legend under Warner Bros. after completion of Tonight, He Comes. Mostow eventually departed from the project due to creative differences. Italian director Gabriele Muccino filled Mostow's vacancy in May 2006. Since Muccino was busy editing The Pursuit of Happyness starring Smith, which Muccino had directed, Smith switched projects to film I Am Legend first for its December 2007 release, and then film Tonight, He Comes afterward. Later in the month, Muccino left the project because of an incompatibility with filming the story. Since Muccino was preparing The Pursuit of Happyness, the studio had delayed the production start for Tonight, He Comes to summer 2007, enabling Warner Bros. to begin production of I Am Legend with Smith.

Filming

In October 2006, Peter Berg was attached to direct Tonight, He Comes with production slated to begin in May 2007 in Los Angeles, the story's setting. Berg had been midway through filming The Kingdom when he heard about the film and called Michael Mann, who had become one of its producers. The new director compared the original script's tone to Leaving Las Vegas (1995), calling it "a scathing character study of this suicidal alcoholic superhero". The director explained the rewrite, "We thought the idea was cool, but we did want to lighten it up. We all did." Before filming began, Tonight, He Comes was retitled John Hancock, and it was eventually shortened to Hancock.

Filming began on Hancock on July 3, 2007, in Los Angeles, having a production budget of $150 million. Locations such as Hollywood Boulevard were designed to look damaged, having rubble, overturned vehicles, and fires. Smith's character is also an alcoholic, so for scenes in liquor stores, the art department designed fake labels such as Pap Smear Vodka for the bottles because "brown-bag brands" like Thunderbird and Night Train refused to lend their names. Reshoots were filmed in Times Square in May 2008, the late date resulting in the cancellation of the film's original world premiere in Australia on June 10, 2008.

Visual effects
Hancock was Peter Berg's first film with visual effects as critical cinematic elements. He considered the computer-generated fight his least favorite part of the film, citing limited control in making the scene successful. According to the director, "Once the fight starts, you're very limited and you're at the mercy of your effects guys ... unless they're really technically oriented ... it's definitely the time we have the least amount of control as directors." He and other filmmakers worked to cut down on the fight scene, believing that the film's success would come from the character study of Smith's character, John Hancock, similar to Robert Downey, Jr.'s acclaimed portrayal of Tony Stark in the previous May's superhero release, Iron Man.

Visual effects supervisor Carey Villegas described Peter Berg's photography as "very high energy", to which the visual effects crew had difficulty adapting. Though the crew had estimated developing 300 visual effects shot at its initial bid, the final tally was approximately 525 shots. An unexpected shot was a scene in which Hancock shoves a prisoner's head up another's anus, and filmmakers initially attempted to film it conventionally, using sleight of hand techniques with cameras. Finding that doing so did not capture "the vulgarity of the gag", the crew was enlisted to use computer-generated effects. Visual effects were also applied in conjunction with the film's choreography, incorporating palm trees, twisters, and debris in the computer-generated fight scene and combining visual effects with a crane shot to portray Hancock's derailment of a freight train.

Release

Theatrical
Hancock had its world premiere as the opener at the 30th Moscow International Film Festival on June 19, 2008. To avoid copyright infringement, organizers took "unprecedented" steps to prevent illegal reproduction of the film.

For the film, Sony created a digital cinema package (DCP) having 4K resolution, containing four times more information than the typical DCP that possessed 2K resolution. Projectors for the higher-resolution package have been installed in 200 theaters in the United States with two dozen in evaluation.

Marketing
The New York Times noted that Hancocks original story and controversial subject matter present a stark contrast to "a summerful of sequels and animated sure shots" and represent a gamble for "an increasingly corporate entertainment industry". Hancock had been reviewed by the Motion Picture Association of America (MPAA) twice, and both times received an R rating instead of the makers' preferred PG-13 rating to target broader audiences.

The MPAA questioned elements including Smith's character drinking in front of a 7-year-old and the character flying under the influence of alcohol. Scenes that were removed to receive a PG-13 rating from the MPAA included a scene of statutory rape, two of three uses of the word "fuck", and intense shots of needles going into arms. The MPAA allowed scenes of Hancock shoving a prisoner's head up another's behind and of Hancock having explosive ejaculation during sexual intercourse, though Berg chose to save the latter scene for the DVD, explaining, "It just wasn't that funny. Never was. You'd put it in front of an audience and there'd be two, maybe three people laughing. There was no way to do that and then regain even a modicum of emotional integrity." The director kept the scene with the prisoners since a Las Vegas test screening was overwhelmingly successful: "At the end of the day, I couldn't ignore an audience when they're laughing that hard." With such elements, studio executives only became comfortable with Hancock when the marketing approach focused on action and humor. Berg noted, "The ad campaign for this movie is much friendlier than the film." The MPAA ultimately gave the film a PG-13 rating, citing "some intense sequences of sci-fi action and violence and language".

Hancock was originally titled Tonight, He Comes and later changed to John Hancock before settling on its final title. Prior to the film's release, marketing consultants attempted to persuade Sony Pictures to again change the title Hancock because it was too vague for audiences, suggesting alternatives like Heroes Never Die, Unlikely Hero, and Less Than Hero. Despite the advice, Sony stayed with Hancock and anticipated marketing on the popularity of the film's star, Will Smith.

Home media
Hancock was part of Sony's experiment in providing content to consumers who own a BRAVIA television equipped with an Internet connection. The film's release over the Internet took place after its theatrical run and before its release on DVD. According to Sony executives, distributing Hancock was an opportunity to showcase BRAVIA, though the method has been perceived as an "obvious threat" to cable companies' video on demand. The film was available to BRAVIA owners from October 28, 2008 to November 10, 2008.

The film was released on DVD,Blu-ray Disc and UMD on November 25, 2008. The single-disc DVD provides a theatrical cut (92 minutes) and an unrated cut (102 minutes) as well as five featurettes and two documentaries. The double-disc DVD includes these features, a digital copy of the film, and two additional making-of extras. The Blu-ray Disc includes these, an on-set visual diary, and a picture-in-picture track. George Lang of The Oklahoman described the unrated cut as "a rare instance when deleted scenes enhance the final product". Christopher Monfette of IGN thought that the Blu-ray Disc was a "beautiful" transfer, the audio was well-balanced, and the featurettes were well-supplied.

In the week ending November 30, Hancock placed first on three video charts: the Nielsen VideoScan First Alert sales chart, Home Media Magazine's video rental chart, and Nielsen's Blu-ray Disc chart. With the year's Black Friday shopping day on November 28, Hancock was the top seller in the Blu-ray Disc format. Over 5.38 million DVDs were sold for a revenue of $91,066,638.

Reception

Box office 
Prior to the film's opening five-day weekend in the United States and Canada, predictions for its weekend performance ranged from as low as $70 million to as high as $125 million. The film was shown in advance screenings on July 1, 2008, in 3,680 theaters in the United States and Canada, grossing $6.8 million. The film was widely released on July 2, 2008, expanding to 3,965 theaters. At the conclusion of the five-day weekend, Hancock took top placement at the box office in the United States and Canada, grossing an estimated $103.8 million. The film had the third-biggest opening 4th of July weekend after Transformers and Spider-Man 2. Hancock was Will Smith's fifth film to open on a 4 July weekend and was his most successful opening to date. The film was also Smith's eighth film in a row to take top placement in the American and Canadian box office and the twelfth film in Smith's career to lead the box office. Hancock was also Peter Berg's strongest opening of his directing career to date.  Chad Hartigan, analyst for Exhibitor Relations, said about Smith's successful opening, "Audiences don't care what critics say; they're going to turn out for anything he does."

Outside the United States and Canada, Hancock grossed $78.3 million in its opening weekend, drawing from 5,444 screenings across 50 markets, ranking it the third highest international opening of 2008 after Indiana Jones and the Kingdom of the Crystal Skull and Iron Man. Hancock averaged $14,382 per screen. It placed on top in 47 of the 50 markets in which it opened; its strongest openings were the United Kingdom with $19.3 million, Germany with $12.4 million, South Korea with $8.5 million, Australia with $7.3 million, and China with $5.5 million. The Chinese opening was the fourth-biggest opening to date for the country. Other international performances included $3.4 million in Brazil and $3.1 million in Taiwan. In Hong Kong, the film opened in first place with $1.3 million, averaging $37,300 across the 35 venues. The film's overall gross for its opening five-day weekend worldwide is $185.6 million.

In the following weekend of July 11, 2008, Hancock fell to second place in the United States and Canada behind Hellboy II: The Golden Army, grossing an estimated $33 million, a "modest" 47% drop in revenue (see second weekend in box office performance). The film's recorded American and Canadian attendance was higher than the Smith feature Men in Black II in both films' second weekend, but it was significantly less than attendance records for Smith's other films, Independence Day and Men in Black through the same point. Internationally Hancock expanded to 8,125 screens across 67 markets, ranking first at the box office again in 30 markets. The film's top opening grosses for the weekend included $11.4 million in Russia (589 screens), $9.9 million in France (739 screens), $4.6 million in Mexico (783 screens), $2.2 million in India (429 screens), $1.7 million in the Netherlands (90 screens), $1.3 million in Belgium (69 screens), and $1 million in Ukraine (81 screens). In territories playing Hancock for a second weekend, the United Kingdom dropped 45% to total $33.4 million to date, Germany 37% to total $24.2 million to date, South Korea 38% to total $14.7 million to date, and Australia 47% to total $14.4 million to date. For the second weekend, with the 67 markets, Hancock accumulated an estimated $71.4 million in the international box office, only a $7.2 million drop from the previous weekend in territories outside the United States and Canada.

In Hancock'''s third weekend of July 18, the film took top placement in the international box office a third time, grossing an estimated $44.8 million from 8,286 screens across 71 territories. The film had beaten The Dark Knight, which premiered that weekend in 20 international markets. Hancock had tracked 32% internationally ahead of its performance in the United States and Canada. It had opened in four new markets for the weekend, ranking first in Spain with $8.6 million from 562 sites and first in Norway with $1 million from 60 sites. Hancock also kept top placement in France, estimating $4.4 million from 741 screens for a total of $16.8 million to date.

The film experienced a late resurgence in the international box office on the weekend of September 12, grossing $10.6 million from 1,425 screens in 31 markets. Making up most of the amount was $8 million from the film's premiere in Italy on 678 screens. Hancock has grossed $227,946,274 in the United States and Canada and $396,440,472 in other territories for a worldwide total of $624,386,746.

Critical response
The site's critical consensus reads, "Though it begins with promise, Hancock suffers from a flimsy narrative and poor execution." At Metacritic, which assigns a weighted average rating, the film has received an average score of 49 out of 100, based on 37 critics, indicating "mixed or average reviews". Audiences polled by CinemaScore gave the film an average grade of "B+" on an A+ to F scale. 

Todd McCarthy of Variety felt that the film's premise was undermined by the execution. McCarthy believed the concept ensured the film was "amusing and plausible" for its first half, but that the second half was full of illogical story developments and missed opportunities. Stephen Farber of The Hollywood Reporter said that the opening established the premise well, but that the film came undone when it began to alternate between comedy and tragedy, and introduced a backstory for Hancock that did not make sense. He said it rewrote its own internal logic in order to pander to its audience. Stephen Hunter in The Washington Post said it had begun with promise, but that the change in tone partway through was so abrupt that the film did not recover. Jim Schembri of The Age called the change in direction "an absolute killer story twist", and David Denby of The New Yorker said it lifted the film to a new level by supplementing the jokes with sexual tension and emotional power.

Jim Schembri wrote that Berg's direction helped to sell Hancock's "well-drawn" backstory, Todd McCarthy said the gritty visual approach adopted by Berg did not mesh well with the "vulgar goofiness" of certain scenes, and Stephen Farber said that Berg's frantic direction compounded the storytelling errors. Stephen Hunter said that Berg had not understood that the shifting tone and plot twists were meant to be humorous, and that he had played straight what was supposed to be a dark comedy and subversive satire. David Denby said Berg's style—especially his use of close-ups—was intended to showcase "genuine actors at work", while Manohla Dargis of The New York Times insisted Berg had taken Hancock to heart and brought gravity to the film.

David Denby described Smith's performance as contrasting with his performances in his other films. He said, "For the first time in his life, Will Smith doesn't flirt with the audience ... he stays in character as a self-hating lonely guy." Stephen Hunter argued that Smith and his co-stars had misunderstood the material in the same manner as Berg. He added that the examination of Smith's character came across at first as an examination of "phenomenally gifted" black sporting superstars who were "marginalized", "dehumanized" and exploited as a product by society. Manohla Dargis was struck by Theron's performance, saying that she enabled Smith to deepen the film's emotional complexity. Todd McCarthy said that Smith's "attitude-laden quips" helped to carry the film's superior first half, and that all three leads performed capably, but he said no opportunity was offered for the supporting characters to register. Roger Ebert writing in the Chicago Sun Times praised the three leads, saying that Smith avoided playing Hancock "as a goofball" and instead portrayed him as a more subtle and serious character. Stephen Farber said that Hancock was a good showcase for the leads, affirming that Smith shone in a film that was only sporadically worthy of his performance, while Colm Andrew of the Manx Independent said that despite the mix of themes "the laughs are frequent and genuine (no forced slapstick), the fight scenes exciting and the emotional stuff quite moving ".

Jim Schembri concluded that the film was "refreshing, savvy, fun and fast". He said it managed to mix comedy and action successfully, and that the drama came across as surprisingly genuine. Stephen Farber believed that the extended development of the film had reduced its quality, but that the visual effects were "stellar" and showed wit. McCarthy praised the effects, but said the film was "both overwrought and severely undernourished." Roger Ebert observed the film was "a lot of fun", and Manohla Dargis admitted that it was "unexpectedly satisfying". She said that while it faltered and felt rushed towards its end, it had an emotional complexity and "raggedness" that spoke with sincerity about essential human vulnerabilities. Stephen Hunter concluded that Hancock was ultimately "indigestible".

Accolades
 Hancock won the award for "Best Summer Action/Adventure Movie" at the 2008 Teen Choice Awards. Smith's performance won him the award for "Favorite Movie Actor" at the 2009 Kids' Choice Awards.

Possible sequel
Director Peter Berg said prior to Hancock release that if the film pulled in as much business as predicted, a sequel, Hancock 2, would likely follow.  After the film's release on DVD and Blu-ray Disc, actor Will Smith said that there was ongoing discussion about a possible sequel, "The ideas aren't ... developed, but we are building out an entire world; I think people are going to be very surprised at the new world of Hancock."  In August 2009, Columbia Pictures hired screenwriters Adam Fierro and Glen Mazzara to write the sequel, and the studio planned to bring back the producing team from the original film.  Charlize Theron confirmed that she would reprise her role, and Berg said to expect a third actor to star as another figure with powers like Smith's and Theron's characters. In January 2012, Berg reaffirmed his plans to make the film. During a 2020 interview, Theron indicated that she remained interested in a Hancock'' sequel but admitted there has been no progress to move forward to production.

References

Further reading

External links

 
 
 
 
 

2008 films
2008 science fiction action films
2008 comedy-drama films
2008 fantasy films
2000s action comedy-drama films
2000s fantasy comedy-drama films
2000s science fiction comedy-drama films
2000s superhero films
2000s English-language films
2000s American films
American action comedy-drama films
American fantasy comedy-drama films
American science fiction comedy-drama films
American superhero films
Columbia Pictures films
Film superheroes
Films about alcoholism
Films directed by Peter Berg
Films produced by Akiva Goldsman
Films produced by Michael Mann
Films produced by Will Smith
Films scored by John Powell
Films set in Los Angeles
Films set in prison
Films shot in Los Angeles
Films shot in New York City
Films with screenplays by Vince Gilligan
Overbrook Entertainment films
Polygamy in fiction
Relativity Media films
Films about amnesia
Parody superheroes
Parodies of Superman
African-American superhero films
African-American films